The Duchess of Richmond's ball was a ball hosted by Charlotte, Duchess of Richmond in Brussels on 15 June 1815, the night before the Battle of Quatre Bras. Charlotte's husband Charles Lennox, 4th Duke of Richmond, was in command of a reserve force in Brussels, which was protecting that city in case Napoleon Bonaparte invaded.

Elizabeth Longford described it as "the most famous ball in history". "The ball was certainly a brilliant affair", at which "with the exception of three generals, every officer high in Wellington's army was there to be seen".

The proceedings were interrupted soon after the arrival of the Duke of Wellington, when he was notified of Napoleon's unexpected advance on the nearby crossroads of Quatre Bras. This forced him to depart after ordering his officers to leave to join their regiments. Some of the officers would soon die in battle and the poignancy of the drama has provided an enduring theme for artists, novelists and poets.

The ball
According to Lady Georgiana (Lennox), a daughter of the Duchess,

Lady Louisa, another of the Duchess's daughters, recalled:

While the exact order of the dances at this ball is not known, there is a comment from a contemporary critical observer about the season in Brussels:  

Arthur Wellesley, 1st Duke of Wellington with his intimate staff arrived some time between 11 pm. and midnight. Shortly before supper, which started around 1 am., Lieutenant Henry Webster, an aide-de-camp to William, Prince of Orange, arrived with a message for the Prince. The Prince handed it to Wellington, who pocketed it unopened. A short time later Wellington read the message—written at around 10 pm., it reported that Prussian forces had been forced by the French to retreat from Fleurus. As Fleurus is north-east of Charleroi this meant that the French had crossed the river Sambre (although Wellington couldn't tell from this message in what strength)—Wellington requested the Prince to return to his headquarters immediately, and then after issuing a few more orders went into supper, where he sat between Lady Frances Webster and Lady Georgiana. To his surprise the Prince of Orange returned and in a whisper informed him of another dispatch, this one sent by Baron Rebecque to the Prince's headquarters at Braine-le-Comte, and timed at 10:30 pm. It informed the Prince that the French had pushed up the main Charleroi to Brussels road nearly as far as Quatre Bras. After repeating to the Prince that he should return to his headquarters, Wellington continued to sit at the table and make small talk for 20 minutes more, before announcing that he would retire to bed. He rose from the supper-table and:

The atmosphere in the room changed when news circulated among the guests that the French were crossing the border:

Katherine Arden, daughter of Richard Arden, 1st Baron Alvanley, described the events towards the end of the ball and the rest of the night:

Ballroom

At the time of the ball no accurate record was kept of the location of the ballroom. In 1887 a plan of the house was published by Lady De Ros (daughter of the Duchess of Richmond), provided by her brother, who were both resident in the house. It was later reprinted in "Reminiscences of Lady de Ros" by the Honourable Mrs J. R. Swinton, her daughter.

Sir William Fraser examined the site and concluded that the room proposed as the ballroom by Lady de Ros was too small a space for the number of people who attended the ball. A short time after his visit, he wrote a letter to The Times which was published on 25 August 1888. He reported that he had likely discovered the room and that it was not part of the principal property that the Duke of Richmond had rented on the Rue des Cendres, but was a coach house that backed onto the property and had an address in the next street, the Rue de la Blanchisserie.

Research by lawyer P. Duvivier and published by Fleischman and Aerts in their 1956 book Bruxelles pendant la bataille de Waterloo put forward an alternative theory. It proposes that, unknown to Fraser, the coach house used as a ballroom had been demolished by the time of his investigations and that the building he assumed was the ballroom was not built until after 1815.

List of invitations
The following were sent invitations to the ball:

 Major-General the Prince of Orange (wounded at Waterloo)
 Prince Frederic of Orange
 Duke of Brunswick (killed by a gunshot at Quatre-Bras)
 Prince of Nassau
 Duc d'Arenberg
 Prince Auguste d'Arenberg
 Prince Pierre d'Arenberg
 , Mayor of Brussels
 Duc et Duchesse de Beaufort and their daughter
 Duc et Duchesse d’Ursel
 Marquis and Marquise d'Assche
 Comte and Comtesse 
 Comtesse Douairiere d'Oultremont and her daughters
 Comte and Comtesse 
 Comte and Comtesse Auguste  and their daughter
 Comte and Comtesse 
 Comte and Comtesse Mercy d'Argenteau
 Comte and Comtesse de Grasiac
 Comtesse de Luiny
 Comtesse de Ruilly
 Baron and Baroness , their daughter and son, C. d'Hooghvoorst
 Monsieur and Madame Vander Capellen
 Baron de Herelt
 Baron de Tuybe
 Baron Brockhausen
 General Baron von Vincent (Austrian envoy, wounded at Waterloo)
 General Pozzo de Borgo (Russian envoy, wounded)
 General Miguel de Álava (Spanish ambassador to The Hague–the court of King William I of the Netherlands)
 Comte de Belgade
 Comte de la Rochefoucauld
 General d'Oudenarde
 Colonel Knife (?), A.D.C.
 Colonel Ducayler
 Major Ronnchenberg, A.D.C.
 Colonel Tripp, A.D.C.
 Captain de Lubeck, A.D.C. to the Duke of Brunswick
 Earl and Countess Conyngham and Lady Elizabeth Conyngham
 Viscount Mount-Charles and Hon. Mr. Conyngham (afterwards 2nd Marquess Conyngham)
 Countess Mount-Norris and Lady Julianna Annesley
 Dowager Countess of Waldegrave
 Duke of Wellington
 Lord and Lady Fitzroy Somerset (neither were present; Lieutenant-Colonel Lord Fitzroy lost an arm at Waterloo)
 Lord and Lady John Somerset
 Mr. and Lady Frances Webster
 Mr. and Lady Caroline Capel and their daughter
 Lord and Lady George Seymour and their daughter
 Mr. and Lady Charlotte Greville
 Viscountess Hawarden
 Sir Henry and Lady Susan Clinton (Lieutenant-General G.C.B., commanding the 2nd Division)
 Lady Alvanley and daughters Katherine and Fanny Arden
 Sir James and Lady Craufurd, and their daughter
 Sir George, K.C.B., and Lady Berkeley
 Lady Sutton and Miss Sutton
 Sir Sidney and Lady Smith, and Miss Rumbolds
 Sir William and Lady Johnstone
 Sir Howe and Lady De Lancey (invited but declined)
 Hon. Mrs. Pole (wife of William Wellesley-Pole, the Duke of Wellington's second brother, later Lady Mornington)
 Mr. and Mrs. Lance, their daughter and son, Mr. Lance, Jr.
 Mr. Ord and his daughters
 Mr. and Mrs. Greathed
 Mr. and Mrs. Lloyd
 Hon. Sir Charles Stuart, G.C.B. (Minister at Brussels) and Mr. Stuart
 Lieutenant-General Earl of Uxbridge (commanded the cavalry; lost a leg at Waterloo)
 Lieutenant-Colonel Earl of Portarlington, 23rd Light Dragoons
 Captain Earl of March, 52nd Foot, A.D.C. to the Prince of Orange
 Major-General Lord Edward Somerset (commanded the Household Brigade of cavalry, wounded at Waterloo)
 Captain Lord Charles FitzRoy, 1st Foot Guards
 Lieutenant-Colonel Lord Robert Manners, 10th Hussars (wounded)
 Lieutenant-General Lord Hill (Commanding the II Corps)
 Lord Rendlesham
 Ensign Lord Hay, A.D.C. (killed at Quatre Bras)
 Lieutenant-Colonel Lord Saltoun
 Lord Apsley (afterwards Earl Bathurst)
 Hon. Colonel Stanhope, Guards
 Hon. Colonel Abercromby, Guards (wounded)
 Hon. Colonel Ponsonby (afterwards Sir Frederick Ponsonby, K.C.B.; severely wounded)
 Hon. Colonel Acheson, Guards
 Hon. Colonel Stewart (wounded)
 Hon. Captain O. Bridgeman, A.D.C. to Lord Hill (wounded)
 Hon. Mr. Percival
 Hon. Ensign Wm. Stopford
 Hon. Mr. John Gordon
 Hon. Ensign Edgecombe
 Hon. Ensign Seymour Bathurst, A.D.C. to Gen. Maitland
 Hon. Ensign Forbes
 Hon. Ensign Hastings Forbes (killed at Waterloo)
 Hon. Major George Dawson (wounded)
 Hon. Mr. Lionel Dawson, 18th Light Dragoons
 Major-General Sir Hussey Vivian (commanding 6th Cavalry Brigade)
 Horace Seymour, A.D.C. (afterwards Sir Horace Seymour, K.C.B.)
 Colonel Hervey, A.D.C. (afterwards Sir Felton Hervey-Bathurst, 1st Baronet)
 Colonel Fremantle, A.D.C.
 Lieutenant Lord George Lennox, A.D.C.
 Captain Lord Arthur Hill, A.D.C. (afterwards General Lord Sandys)
 Major Henry Percy, A.D.C. (son of 1st Earl of Beverley, delivered news of the victory to London along with two Eagles and dispatches)
 Hon. Lieutenant George Cathcart, A.D.C. (afterwards Sir George Cathcart, killed at Inkerman in 1854)
 Lieutenant-Colonel Sir Alexander Gordon, A.D.C. (died of his wounds at Waterloo)
 Colonel Sir Colin Campbell, K.C.B., A.D.C.
 Major-General Sir John Byng, G.C.B. (created Earl of Strafford, commanded 2nd Brigade of Guards)
 Lieutenant-General Sir John Elley, K.C.B. (deputy Adjutant-General of Cavalry, wounded at Waterloo)
 Lieutenant-Colonel Sir George Scovell, K.C.B. (Major, commanding Staff Corps of Cavalry)
 Colonel Sir George Wood, Colonel, Royal Artillery
 Lieutenant-Colonel Sir Henry Bradford (wounded)
 Lieutenant-Colonel Sir Robert C. Hill, (brother of Lord Hill, wounded)
 Lieutenant-Colonel Sir Noel Hill, K.C.B. (brother of Lord Hill)
 Sir William Ponsonby, K.C.B. (brother of Lord Ponsonby; commanded the Union Brigade of cavalry; killed at Waterloo)
 Lieutenant-Colonel Sir Andrew Barnard (commanding 1st Battalion the 95th Foot (Rifles) wounded, afterwards Governor of Chelsea Hospital)
 Major-General Sir Denis Pack, G.C.B. (commanded the 9th Brigade, wounded)
 Major-General Sir James Kempt, G.C.B. (commanded the 8th Brigade)
 Sir Pulteney Malcolm RN
 Lieutenant-General Sir Thomas Picton, (commanded 5th Division, killed at Waterloo)
 Major-General Sir Edward Barnes, Adjutant-General (wounded at Waterloo)
 Sir James Gambier
 Hon. General Francis Dundas
 Lieutenant-General Cooke (Commanded 1st Division, wounded)
 Major-General Maitland (afterwards Sir Peregrine Maitland, G.C.B.; commanded 1st Brigade of Guards)
 Major-General Adam (not present; commanded 3rd Infantry Brigade; afterwards Sir Frederick Adam, K.C.B.)
 Colonel Washington
 Colonel Woodford (afterwards F.M. Sir Alexander Woodford, G.C.B., Governor of Chelsea Hospital)
 Colonel Rowan, 52nd Regiment of Foot (wounded, afterwards Sir Charles Rowan, Chief Commissioner of Police)
 Colonel Wyndham, Coldstream Guards (wounded, afterwards General Sir Henry Wyndham)
 Colonel Cumming, 18th Light Dragoons
 Colonel Bowater, 3rd Foot Guards (wounded, afterwards General Sir Edward Bowater)
 Colonel Robert Torrens, 1st West Indies Regiment (afterwards Adjutant-General in India)
 Colonel William Fuller, 1st Dragoon Guards (killed at Waterloo) 
 Colonel Dick, 42nd Foot (wounded, killed at Sobraon in 1846)
 Colonel Cameron, 92nd Foot (killed at Quatre Bras)
 Lieutenant-Colonel D. Barclay, 1st Foot Guards, A.D.C. to the Duke of York
 Captain Clement Hill, 1st Foot Guards (wounded, brother to Lord Hill)
 Major Gunthorpe, 1st Foot Guards, A.D.C. to General Maitland
 Major C.H. Churchill, 1st Foot Guards, A.D.C. to Lord Hill and Q.M.G.
 Major Hamilton, 4th West Indies Regiment, A.D.C. to Gen. Sir E. Barnes
 Major Thomas Noel Harris, Brigade Major to Sir Hussey Vivian (lost an arm at Waterloo)
 Major Thomas Hunter Blair, 91st Foot (wounded)
 Captain D. Mackworth, 7th Foot, A.D.C. to Lord Hill
 Captain Edward Keane, 7th Hussars, A.D.C. to Sir Hussey Vivian
 Captain C. A. FitzRoy, Royal Horse Guards
 Captain T. Wildman, 7th Hussars, A.D.C. to Lord Uxbridge (wounded)
 Captain James Fraser, 7th Hussars (wounded, afterwards Sir James Fraser, Baronet)
 Captain William Verner, 7th Hussars (wounded)
 Captain Elphinstone, 7th Hussars (taken prisoner, 17 June)
 Captain H. Webster, 9th Light Dragoons
 Captain H. Somerset, 18th Hussars, A.D.C. to General Lord Edward Somerset
 Captain Yorke, 52nd Foot, A.D.C. to Gen. Adam (afterwards Sir Charles Yorke, not present)
 Captain Hon. George Gore, 85th Foot, A.D.C. to Sir James Kempt
 Captain Pakenham, Royal Artillery
 Captain Henry Dumaresq, 9th Foot, A.D.C. to Gen. Sir John Byng (was wounded in the chest by a musket ball while delivering a dispatch to the Duke of Wellington)
 Captain F. Dawkins, 1st Foot Guards, A.D.C.
 Captain Disbrowe, 1st Foot Guards, A.D.C. to General Sir G. Cook
 Captain George Bowles, Coldstream Guards (afterwards General Sir George Bowles, Lieutenant of the Tower)
 Captain R.B. Hesketh, 3rd Foot Guards (wounded)
 Captain J. Gurwood, 10th Hussars (wounded, afterwards Colonel Gurwood)
 Captain C. Allix, 1st Foot Guards
 Captain Hon. Francis Russell, A.D.C.
 Lieutenant F. Brooke, 1st Dragoon Guards (killed at Waterloo)
 Cornet W. Huntley, 1st Dragoon Guards
 Mr. Lionel Hervey (diplomat)
 Mr. Leigh
 Captain A. Shakespear, 10th Hussars
 Mr. O’Grady, 7th Hussars (afterwards Lord Guillamore)
 Captain C. Smyth, 95th Foot (Rifles), Brigade-Major to Sir Denis Packe (killed at Waterloo)
 Ensign G. Fludyer, 1st Foot Guards (wounded)
 Ensign Hon. John Montagu, Coldstream Guards (wounded)
 Ensign Henry Montagu, 3rd Foot Guards (later Lord Rokeby, G.C.B.)
 Ensign Algernon Greville, 1st Foot Guards
 Ensign David Baird, 3rd Foot Guards (wounded)
 Lieutenant James Robinson, 32nd Foot
 Ensign William James, 3rd Foot Guards
 Mr. Chad
 Mr. A.F. Dawkins, 15th Hussars (wounded)
 Dr. Hyde
 Second-Lieutenant Gustavus Hume, Royal Artillery
 Rev. Samuel Briscall

Cultural influences
 
The ball inspired a number of writers and artists in the nineteenth century. Sir Walter Scott mentioned it in passing in Paul's Letters to his Kinsfolk. It was described by William Makepeace Thackeray in Vanity Fair and by Lord Byron in Childe Harold's Pilgrimage. Byron emphasises the contrast between the glamour of the ball and the horror of battle, concentrating on the emotional partings,

Thackeray's dramatic use of the ball in Vanity Fair inspired, in turn, a number of screen depictions.  One notable example comes from the 1935 RKO production Becky Sharp, the first full-length Technicolor film released after perfection of the full-color three-strip method, which makes the Duchess of Richmond's Ball the first historical set-piece ever staged in a full-colour feature film. Critics of the day were not kind to the picture itself, but the sequence in which the officers hurry to leave the ball – the red of their coats suddenly and emotionally filling the frame – was widely praised as showing great promise for the dramatic use of colour on-screen.

The ball also inspired artists, including John Everett Millais, who painted The Black Brunswicker in 1860, Henry Nelson O'Neil who painted Before Waterloo in 1868 and Robert Hillingford who painted The Duchess of Richmond's Ball.

The ball was a scene in the third act of a melodrama called In the Days of the Duke written by Charles Haddon Chambers and J. Comyns Carr, it was displayed sumptuously in the 1897 production, with a backdrop by William Harford showing the hall and staircase inside the Duchess's house.

Several characters attend the ball in Georgette Heyer's 1937 novel An Infamous Army, and also in her novelisation of the life of Sir Harry Smith, 1st Baronet, The Spanish Bride.

The ball was used by Sergei Bondarchuk in his 1970 film Waterloo for dramatic effect. Bondarchuk contrasted an army at peace with the impending battle and in particular as a dramatic backdrop to show how completely Napoleon managed to "humbug" Wellington.

In the novel Sharpe's Waterloo (1990), Bernard Cornwell uses the ball in a similar way to Bondarchuk, placing his character Richard Sharpe in the role of the aide who brings the catastrophic news to Wellington, but includes a sub-plot where Sharpe brawls with Lord John Rossendale, Sharpe's wife's lover and a man who owes money to him.

A fictional account is given of the Duchess of Richmond's ball in The Campaigners, Volume 14 of The Morland Dynasty, a series of historical novels by author Cynthia Harrod-Eagles. Some of the fictional Morland family and other characters attend the ball and the events that unfold are seen and experienced through their eyes.

The ball serves as the backdrop for the first chapter of Julian Fellowes's 2016 novel, Belgravia. The chapter is titled "Dancing into Battle", and portrays a potential mésalliance that is avoided the next day by a battlefield fatality at Quatre Bras. Fellowes incorporates into his book real events that occurred during the ball, and inserts his fictional characters into them.

On 15 June 1965 the British Ambassador in Brussels held a ball to commemorate the 150th anniversary of the Battle of Waterloo and the Duchess of Richmond's ball. 540 guests attended the function of whom the majority were Belgians. This commemoration ball has now become an annual event with the money raised going to support several charities.

Notes

References
, and also: 

 
 – reproduced on the website of The American WideScreen Museum

 

 Endnotes:
Cf. Fonds Duvivier. Ce que devint l’hotel de la rue de la Blanchisserie. In: LMB. Archieffonds Franse periode Vol.III Box 25 I.3 Chapter 5 pp. 53–57

Further reading

 
 – Commenting on the paintings "First off, of course, the dresses and hairstyles of the women are much more fashionable for the 1860s–70s than 1815. The grandly appointed settings are at odds with Lady de Ros's description of the ball taking place …"
 pp. 154–156
  – contains a timeline on the most notable events
 contemporary location, Google Map. compare with the diagram on page 307, of Fraser's book (cited in the References section above).
 Cites Cf. Dalton, Ch. "The Waterloo roll call".

External links 
 

Balls (dance party)
European court festivities
1815 in the Southern Netherlands
19th century in Brussels
June 1815 events
Culture in Brussels